Elaeocarpus is a genus of nearly five hundred species of flowering plants in the family Elaeocarpaceae native to the Western Indian Ocean, Tropical and Subtropical Asia, and the Pacific. Plants in the genus Elaeocarpus are trees or shrubs with simple leaves, flowers with four or five petals usually, and usually blue fruit.

Description
Plants in the genus Elaeocarpus are mostly evergreen trees or shrubs, a few are epiphytes or lianes, and some are briefly deciduous. The leaves are arranged alternately, simple (strictly compound with only one leaflet) with a swelling where the petiole meets the lamina, often have toothed edges, usually have prominent veins and often turn red before falling. The flowers are usually arranged in a raceme, usually bisexual, have four or five sepals and petals and many stamens. The petals usually have finely-divided, linear lobes. The fruit is a oval to spherical drupe that is usually blue, sometimes black, with a sculptured endocarp.

Taxonomy and naming
The genus Elaeocarpus was first formally described in 1753 by Carl Linnaeus in Species Plantarum, although Johannes Burman published an illustration of "Elaecarpus serrata" in his book Thesaurus zeylanicus, but without a description of the genus. The first species described by Linnaeus (the type species) was Elaeocarpus serratus. The name Elaeocarpus is derived from Greek and means ‘olive-fruited’.

Species
See also List of Elaeocarpus species

There are about 488 species of Elaeocarpus, found on the islands of the western Indian Ocean, in tropical and subtropical Asia, Australia and on Pacific islands.

Selected species

Elaeocarpus acmosepalus 
Elaeocarpus amoenus  - (Sri Lanka)
Elaeocarpus angustifolius  - (India, Bangladesh, China, Indochina, Indonesia, Australia, Papua New Guinea and surrounding islands)
Elaeocarpus arnhemicus  - (northern Australia, New Guinea)
Elaeocarpus bancroftii  - (Queensland)
Elaeocarpus blascoi  - (India, threatened)
Elaeocarpus bojeri  - (Mauritius)
Elaeocarpus brigittae  - (Sumatra)
Elaeocarpus calomala  - 
Elaeocarpus carolinae  - (north-east Queensland)
Elaeocarpus ceylanicus  - (Sri Lanka)
Elaeocarpus colnettianus  - (New Caledonia)
Elaeocarpus cordifolius  - (Kalimantan, Sarawak)
Elaeocarpus coriaceus  - (Sri Lanka)
Elaeocarpus costatus  - (Lord Howe Island)
Elaeocarpus cruciatus  - (Malaysia, threatened)
Elaeocarpus culminicola  - (New Guinea, Queensland)
Elaeocarpus dentatus  - (New Zealand)
Elaeocarpus dinagatensis  - (Philippines)
Elaeocarpus eriobotryoides  - (Malaysia)
Elaeocarpus eumundi  - (Australia)
Elaeocarpus ferrugineus  - (Malaysia, Borneo)
Elaeocarpus fraseri  - (Malaysia)
Elaeocarpus ganitrus 
Elaeocarpus gaussenii  - (India, critically endangered)
Elaeocarpus gigantifolius  - (Philippines)
Elaeocarpus glandulifer  - (Sri Lanka)
Elaeocarpus grandis  – blue quandong (New South Wales, Queensland)
Elaeocarpus griffithii  – (Island and mainland Southeast Asia)
Elaeocarpus hedyosmus  - (Sri Lanka)
Elaeocarpus holopetalus  – (New South Wales, Victoria, Australia)
Elaeocarpus homalioides 
Elaeocarpus hookerianus  – (New Zealand)
Elaeocarpus hygrophilus  – (Thailand)
Elaeocarpus inopinatus  – (Borneo)
Elaeocarpus integrifolius  – (Mauritius)
Elaeocarpus joga  – (Mariana Islands, Palau)
Elaeocarpus kirtonii  – silver quandong (New South Wales, Queensland)
Elaeocarpus lanceifolius  – (Tropical Asia)
Elaeocarpus miriensis 
Elaeocarpus montanus  – (Sri Lanka)
Elaeocarpus moratii 
Elaeocarpus munroi 
Elaeocarpus nanus 
Elaeocarpus obovatus  – (Australia)
Elaeocarpus obtusus 
Elaeocarpus prunifolius 
Elaeocarpus pseudopaniculatus 
Elaeocarpus recurvatus 
Elaeocarpus reticosus 
Elaeocarpus reticulatus  – blueberry ash (eastern Australia)
Elaeocarpus royenii 
Elaeocarpus rugosus 
Elaeocarpus sedentarius 
Elaeocarpus serratus  – (South Asia)
Elaeocarpus simaluensis 
Elaeocarpus stipularis  – (Indo-China, Malaysia)
Elaeocarpus subvillosus  – (Japan, Taiwan, China, Indochina). 
Elaeocarpus sylvestris 
Elaeocarpus symingtonii 
Elaeocarpus taprobanicus  – (Sri Lanka)
Elaeocarpus thorelii  – (Cambodia)
Elaeocarpus venustus 
Elaeocarpus williamsianus  – hairy quandong (New South Wales)

References

 
Elaeocarpaceae genera
Taxa named by Carl Linnaeus